Coptops albonotata is a species of beetle in the family Cerambycidae. It was described by Maurice Pic in 1917. It is known from China.

References

albonotata
Beetles described in 1917